Rauchkäse (smoke cheese) is a German variety of smoked cheese, known for being semi-soft with a smoky brown rind. The most famous variety is Bruder Basil, named for dairy entrepreneur Basil Weixler, whose dairy company is still in operation today. It is typically smoked using birch or spruce woods.

See also

 List of cheeses#Germany
 German cuisine
 List of German cheeses
 List of cheeses
 List of smoked foods

References

German cheeses
Smoked cheeses